The 2013 season is the 34th season of competitive football in Malaysia.

Promotion and relegation

Coaching changes

Pre-season

In season

National teams competitions

Men's senior team

1 Non FIFA 'A' international match
XI Malaysia uses a selection of players from the Malaysia Super League, Using the name Malaysia XI

Men's under-23 team

2013 Summer Universiade

Group stage

Knockout stage

2013 Merdeka Tournament

Group stage

Final

Menpora Cup 
Source:

2013 Southeast Asian Games

Group stage

Knouckout stage

Men's under-19 team

Men's under-16 team

League tables

Super League

Premier League

FAM League

President Cup

Domestic Cups

Charity Shield

FA Cup

The final was played on 29 June 2013 at Bukit Jalil National Stadium, Kuala Lumpur.

Malaysia Cup

The final was played on 3 Nov 2013 at Shah Alam Stadium, Shah Alam.

References